, also known by the abbreviation , is a Japanese four-panel manga written and illustrated by Yui Hara. The series began serialization in Houbunsha's Manga Time Kirara Max magazine in June 2010 issue and is licensed in English by Yen Press. An anime television adaptation by Studio Gokumi aired in Japan between July and September 2013, with a second season airing between April and June 2015. An original video animation was released in November 2016, and an anime film premiered on August 20, 2021.

Plot
Shinobu Omiya is a Japanese high school girl who, five years ago, got a homestay in England with a girl named Alice Cartelet. One day, Shinobu receives a letter from Alice saying she is coming to Japan to live with her. Surely enough, Alice appears and joins Shinobu and her friends Aya Komichi and Yoko Inokuma at her school. She is soon followed by Alice's half British, half Japanese friend from England, Karen Kujo.

Characters

The graceful, optimistic protagonist, a high school girl who previously stayed over at Alice's home in England. She dreams of becoming an interpreter, but generally has bad grades in English, among other subjects, although she shows talent as a seamstress. She loves western culture, and notably has an obsession with blonde hair. Her friends nickname her Shino, a shortened term for her name. 

A girl from England who transfers into Shinobu's school and lives at her house. Highly intelligent, she loves Japanese culture and speaks the language fluently, but can also act childish at times, and has a complex about her short stature.

Nicknamed "Ayaya" by Karen, Shinobu's classmate, and friend since middle school. Throughout the series, she increasingly develops a crush on Yoko, however she has difficulty being honest with her feelings, and often snaps at her, only to feel bad about it later on. She frequently misinterprets situations between herself and Yoko, responding indignantly and blushing. As a student, she is highly intelligent, and even passed an entrance exam to a prestigious high school, however she turns down the opportunity as she does not wish to be separated from her friends. She is also very shy, and dislikes physical exercise, preferring indoor activities.

Shinobu's classmate and childhood friend since elementary school, who often serves as the tsukkomi character. Cheerful, boyish, and very energetic, she seems to be oblivious of Aya's sentiment towards her, however she becomes increasingly aware that Aya cares about her. Like Shinobu, she often struggles to get good grades in school, and she is also very clumsy, on one occasion accidentally breaking her sister's teddy bear. She has two younger siblings: a brother and sister, whom she cares deeply about, but she often worries about their tendency to lie.

A half-British, half-Japanese girl who comes from a rich family and was Alice's friend back in England. She also comes to Japan and enrolls in Shinobu's school. She is very energetic, fun-loving and carefree, not even worrying about her grades or her getting fat. She often wears a Union Jack parka jacket over her school uniform and generally speaks in broken Japanese. Being incredibly friendly, she seeks to make friends with all of her classmates, and even her second-year homeroom teacher Akari Kuzehashi, albeit with varying degrees of success. 

Karen's classmate and best friend, who is a member of the tennis club and is often seen bringing Karen homemade snacks. Much like Shinobu, she also has a fascination with blonde hair and sees Alice and Karen as royalty. Her family owns a restaurant. Because of her blonde hair fetish, she develops a major crush towards Karen, and on one occasion finds herself incredibly nervous to ask Karen for her email address.

Shinobu's older sister who is a fashion model. She is often worried about Shinobu, because she is very careless and absent-minded but she manages to handle her very well.

Shinobu's English teacher, who is often seen wearing a tracksuit jersey. She is kind, meek, and absent-minded. Alice initially sees her as a rival for Shinobu's affections, but grows fond of her over time. She has two older brothers. She spends most of her time with Kuzehashi, and is constantly asked for advice from her.

A home economics teacher who appears after a year has passed in the story and is the homeroom teacher of class 2-A. She is very conscientious about the example she sets for her students, however she also wants to get along with her students, but always ends up intimidating them. She and Karen have an unusual relationship, initially not getting along with her, but warming up to her over time. Regardless, she often has to berate Karen for forgetting her homework or falling asleep in class, however she makes an increasing effort to not be too stern with her.
 

Yoko's younger brother and sister, who are both twins. They are often notorious liars, making up weird tales, and generally speak in monotone. They also help Aya with her crush on Yoko.

Books and publications

Manga
The original manga by Yui Hara began serialization in Houbunsha's Manga Time Kirara Max magazine in June 2010 issue (April 19, 2010). Eleven tankōbon volumes and two anthology comics have been released as of April 27, 2020. The series has been licensed in English by Yen Press, and in Indonesian by Elex Media Komputindo. A spin-off manga titled Kin-iro Mosaic Best wishes was launched in the July 2020 issue (May 19, 2020) after the ending of the original series, and ended serialization in the May 2021 issue (March 18, 2021). The spin-off manga is also licensed in English by Yen Press.

Art book

Comics anthology

TV Anime Official Guide Book

Anime

A 12-episode anime adaptation was produced by Studio Gokumi, with direction by Tensho and character design by Kazuyuki Ueda. The series aired in Japan on AT-X between July 6 and September 21, 2013, and was simulcast by Crunchyroll. The respective opening and ending themes are "Jumping!!" and "Your Voice", both performed by Rhodanthe* (Asuka Nishi, Manami Tanaka, Risa Taneda, Yumi Uchiyama, and Nao Tōyama). The series is licensed in North America by Sentai Filmworks under the title Kinmoza!. A second season, titled Hello!! Kin-iro Mosaic, aired between April 5, 2015, and June 21, 2015, once again simulcast by Crunchyroll. As with the first season, the second season has been licensed by Sentai Filmworks under the title Hello!! Kinmoza!. An original video animation episode, Kin-iro Mosaic: Pretty Days, was released on March 3, 2017. Manga Entertainment licensed both seasons for a UK release, and were released by Animatsu Entertainment as a DVD and Blu-ray combo pack on October 9, 2017, and December 18, 2017. An anime film was announced in March 2020. The film, titled Kin-iro Mosaic: Thank You!!, premiered on August 20, 2021. The film is directed by Munenori Nawa and co-animated by Studio Gokumi and AXsiZ, with Yuniko Ayana writing the scripts, Kazuyuki Ueda designing the characters, and Ruka Kawada composing the film's music. In 2022 both season were removed from Crunchyroll.

Theme song
Season 1
Opening theme
"Jumping!!" by Rhodanthe*
Lyrics: yukio
Composer: Meis Clauson
Arranger: Hiroshi Uesugi
Ending theme
"Your Voice" by Rhodanthe*
Lyrics, composer: Takeshi Nakatsuka
Arranger: Hiroshi Uesugi
Insert song
"Happy birthday to you" (おたんじょうびのうた) (Episode 4)
by Alice Cartelet (Manami Tanaka)
 by Alice Cartelet (Manami Tanaka) (Episode 7)
Lyrics: RUCCA
Composer: Takaharu Anzai
Arranger: Nao Tokisawa
 by Rhodanthe* (Episode 7)
Lyrics: RUCCA
Composer: Ken-G
Arranger: Hiroshi Uesugi
Season 2
Opening theme
 by Rhodanthe* (Episodes 2–9, 11–12)
Lyrics: yuiko
Composer: Meis Clauson
Arranger: Hiroshi Uesugi
The first part of episodes 3, 5, 7, 9, and 11 was solo of Alice Cartelet (Manami Tanaka), Shinobu Omiya (Asuka Nishi), Karen Kujo (Nao Toyama), Aya Komichi (Risa Taneda), and Yoko Inokuma (Yumi Uchiyama) respectively with different lyrics. Other episodes is the chorus of Rhodanthe*
 (Episode 10)
Lyrics: yuiko
Composer: Masaaki Ishihara
Arranger: Hiroshi Uesugi
Ending theme
"My Best Friends" by Rhodanthe*
Lyrics, Composer: Takeshi Nakatsuka
Arranger: Hiroshi Uesugi

Blu-ray Disc/DVD

CD

Appearances in other media
Characters and songs from Kiniro Mosaic appear alongside other anime characters in the rhythm game Miracle Girls Festival, which is developed by Sega for the PlayStation Vita. Characters from the series also appear in the mobile game Kirara Fantasia.

References

External links
 

2010 manga
2013 anime television series debuts
Anime series based on manga
AXsiZ
Comedy anime and manga
Houbunsha manga
Seinen manga
Sentai Filmworks
Slice of life anime and manga
Studio Gokumi
Tokyo MX original programming
Yen Press titles
Yonkoma